Igor Jurisica is a Professor in the departments of Computer Science and Medical Biophysics at the University of Toronto. He is a Tier I Canada Research Chair in Integrative Cancer Informatics, and an associate editor for BMC Bioinformatics, Proteomes, Cancer Informatics, International Journal of Knowledge Discovery in Bioinformatics, and Interdisciplinary Sciences: Computational Life Sciences. In 2014, 2015 and 2016, he is an ISI Highly Cited Researcher.

See also
 Computational biology

External links
 About Jurisica's publications

References

Living people
Computer scientists
Computational biology
Canadian biologists
Year of birth missing (living people)